Robert Caymaris (born 27 September 1935) is a French gymnast. He competed in eight events at the 1960 Summer Olympics.

References

External links
 

1935 births
Living people
French male artistic gymnasts
Olympic gymnasts of France
Gymnasts at the 1960 Summer Olympics
Sportspeople from Algiers